John David Enfield,  (1934 – 11 August 1992) was a senior Australian Public Service official and administrator.

Life and career
John Enfield was born in 1934. He studied engineering at the University of Sydney.

Enfield joined the Department of Defence in 1962, working in the department's systems analysis branch on weapons effectiveness and acquisitions. He moved to the Department of the Treasury in 1972 to head the Transport and Communications Branch, including as part of the Second Sydney Airport Committee.

He later moved to the Department of the Prime Minister and Cabinet, into a role as a Deputy Secretary until 1983.

Whilst Secretary of the Department of Territories and Local Government, and later the Department of Territories, Enfield established the financial path for the Australian Capital Territory to self-government.

Enfield died of cancer on 11 August 1992, his funeral was held at Old Parliament House in Canberra.

Awards and honours
Enfield was made an Officer of the Order of Australia in June 1991 in recognition of his services to public administration.

In 2009, a street in the Canberra suburb of Casey was named Enfield Street in John Enfield's honour.

References

1934 births
1992 deaths
Deaths from cancer in the Australian Capital Territory
Officers of the Order of Australia
20th-century Australian public servants